Mount Adagdak is a Pleistocene age stratovolcano on the northernmost extremity of Adak Island in the Aleutian Islands, Alaska.

The volcano is made up of rock from three different periods of activity. The youngest rock was argon dated to between 205,000 - 215,000 years old.

John Hunter of Quicklaunch has twice proposed the use of Mount Adagdak's western slope as the emplacement site for a light-gas gun to launch small payloads into orbit for use at ISS.

See also
 List of volcanoes in the United States of America
 List of stratovolcanoes

References

External links
 Alaska Volcano Observatory

Landforms of Aleutians West Census Area, Alaska
Stratovolcanoes of the United States
Mountains of Alaska
Volcanoes of Alaska
Aleutian Range
Mountains of Unorganized Borough, Alaska
Volcanoes of Unorganized Borough, Alaska
Pleistocene stratovolcanoes